Turbinoptidae is a family of mites belonging to the order Sarcoptiformes.

Genera:
 Colinoptes Fain, 1960
 Mycteroptes Fain, 1956
 Neoschoutedenocoptes Fain & Hyland, 1967
 Oxleya Domrow, 1965
 Passerrhinoptes Fain, 1956
 Rhinoptes Castro & Pereira, 1951
 Schoutedenocoptes Fain, 1956
 Turbinoptes Boyd, 1949

References 

Acari